William McGregor (June 24, 1836 – May 14, 1903) was a Canadian businessman and political figure. He represented Essex in the House of Commons of Canada as a Liberal member from 1874 to 1878 and from 1891 to 1900.

He was born in Sarnia, Upper Canada, in 1836 and educated in Amherstburg. He supplied horses to the Union Army during the American Civil War. McGregor was president of the Walkerville Wagon Company Limited. He also owned the street railway in Windsor, a bank, a mill and a fence company. In 1866, he married Jessie L. Peden. McGregor served as reeve of Windsor for six years and as warden for Essex County from 1869 to 1870 and from 1872 to 1873. He also served as customs collector at Windsor. He died in Windsor at the age of 66.

His son Gordon took over his father's wagon factory and later became the first president of the Ford Motor Company of Canada. The town of McGregor, now part of Essex, Ontario, was named after William McGregor.

Electoral record

References

External links 
 

1836 births
1903 deaths
Liberal Party of Canada MPs
Members of the House of Commons of Canada from Ontario
Pre-Confederation Canadian businesspeople